Au-delà du délire is the third album by the French progressive rock band Ange, released in 1974. The French edition of Rolling Stone magazine named this album the 73rd greatest French rock album (out of 100).

Track listing 
 "Godevin le vilain"  – 2:59
 "Les Longues nuits d'Isaac"  – 4:13
 "Si j'étais le messie"  – 3:03
 "Ballade pour une orgie"  – 3:20
 "Exode"  – 4:59
 "La Bataille du sucre (La Colère des dieux)"  – 6:29
 "Fils de lumière"  – 3:52
 "Au-delà du délire"  – 9:02

Personnel

Ange 
 Jean Michel Brezovar – guitar, vocals, flute
 Christian Décamps – Hammond organ, piano, harpsichord, vocals
 Francis Decamps – keyboards, vocals
 Daniel Haas – bass, guitar
 Gerald Jelsch – drums, percussion

Additional musicians 
 Eric Bibonne – voice of the child on "La Bataille du sucre"
 Michel Lefloch – voice of Bernhard l'Hermite on "Au-delà du délire"
 Henry Loustau – violin on "Godevin le vilain"

Release history

References 

1974 albums
Ange albums